Chagunius chagunio is a species of cyprinid in the genus Chagunius. It inhabits wetlands in Bangladesh, India, Nepal and Bhutan.

References

Cyprinidae
Fish of Bangladesh
Fish of India
Fish of Nepal
Cyprinid fish of Asia